Chi (pinyin: chí) is a Chinese surname. It is also Romanized "Chi" (지) in Korean.

Chi is also the Wade–Giles romanization of Ji, the pronunciation of several common Chinese surnames.

Notable People
Chi Li, (池莉, born 1957) is a contemporary female Chinese writer based in Wuhan
 Chi In-jin (Korean: 지인진, Hanja: 池仁珍, born July 18, 1973, in Seoul) is a South Korean former boxer in the featherweight division
 Chi Zhongguo (Chinese: 池忠国; Korean: 지충국; RR: Ji Chung-guk) is a Chinese footballer of Korean descent
 Chi Wenyi (Chinese: 池文一; Korean: 지문일; born 18 February 1988 in Yanji, Yanbian) is a Chinese footballer of Korean descent
 Chi Zhiqiang (Chinese: 池志强; 16 November 1924 – 7 January 2020) was a Chinese pharmacologist and researcher at Shanghai Institute of Materia Medica
 Chi Biqing (Chinese: 池必卿) (1917–2007) was a People's Republic of China politician
 Chi Chunxue (Chinese: 池春雪; pinyin: Chí Chūnxuě; born 1998) is a Chinese cross-country skier
 Michael Chi or Chi Yufeng (Chinese: 池宇峰; pinyin: Chí Yǔ Fēng; born 1971) is a Chinese Internet entrepreneur, the founder and chairman of Perfect World Investment & Holding Group
Chi Hyun-jung (池炫靜, Korean: 지현정; born December 6, 1971) is a South Korean former competitive figure skater
 Chi Minghua (Chinese: 池明华; born March 6, 1962) is a Chinese football coach and former international football player

See also
 Reiko Ike, (池 玲子, Ike Reiko, born May 25, 1953 in Tokyo, Japan) is a Japanese actress, singer, and entertainer, born Ikeda Reiko (池田玲子)
 Ikeda (surname) (written: 池田) 

Chinese-language surnames
Individual Chinese surnames